Frederike Charlotte Koleiski (born 25 August 1987) is a German Paralympic athlete who competes in discus throw and shot put in international elite competitions. She is a World champion in shot put and narrowly missed a medal at the 2016 Summer Paralympics.

References

External links
 
 

1987 births
Living people
People from Wesel
Sportspeople from Düsseldorf (region)
Sportspeople from Duisburg
Paralympic athletes of Germany
German female discus throwers
German female shot putters
World Para Athletics Championships winners
Medalists at the World Para Athletics Championships
Athletes (track and field) at the 2016 Summer Paralympics
20th-century German women
21st-century German women